Alvin Heider Rentería Montoya (born January 4, 1978) is a male triple jumper from Colombia. Rentería set his personal best (16.66 metres) in the men's triple jump on September 15, 2001 in Ambato. He is a four-time national champion in the men's triple jump event, and also won a long jump title in 2000.

He won the triple jump bronze medal at the 1997 South American Junior Championships in Athletics. At the turn of the decade he stepped into the senior ranks and won a silver medal at the 2001 Bolivarian Games. He followed this up by winning the triple jump gold medal at the 2002 Central American and Caribbean Games.

Achievements

References

1978 births
Living people
Colombian male triple jumpers
Central American and Caribbean Games gold medalists for Colombia
Competitors at the 2002 Central American and Caribbean Games
Central American and Caribbean Games medalists in athletics
20th-century Colombian people
21st-century Colombian people